Key is the debut album of Meredith Monk, released in 1971 through Increase Records. In 2017, Tompkins Square re-released Key for Record Store Day.

Track listing

Personnel 
Musicians
Lanny Harrison – vocals
Dick Higgins – vocals
Meredith Monk – vocals, Jew's harp, electronic organ
Mark Monstermaker – vocals
Daniel Ira Sverdlik – vocals
Collin Walcott – Mr̥daṅgaṃ, vocals, production
Production
Tom Clack – engineering
Paul Gruwell – art direction
John Horton – engineering, mixing
Peter Moore – photography
Daniel Nagrin – engineering
Peter Pilafian – engineering

References

External links 
 

1971 debut albums
Meredith Monk albums